WXJB (99.9 FM) is an American radio station licensed to serve the community of Homosassa, Florida. The station, established in 2010, is owned and operated by Hernando Broadcasting Company, Inc. The broadcast license is held by George S. Flinn, Jr.

Programming
WXJB broadcasts a news/talk radio format to the Nature Coast region of Florida. , weekday programming on the station includes syndicated talk shows hosted by Brian Kilmeade, Rush Limbaugh, Sean Hannity, and Mark Levin, plus Ground Zero, Coast to Coast AM hosted by George Noory and Wall Street Journal This Morning. Local weekday programming includes The Nature Coast Morning News with Mike Reeves. Weekend programming includes syndicated shows hosted by Leo Laporte, Bill Handel, and Gary Sullivan, plus classic Art Bell shows rebranded Somewhere in Time.

History
In February 2007, broadcaster George S. Flinn, Jr., applied to the Federal Communications Commission (FCC) for a construction permit for a new broadcast radio station. The FCC granted this permit on June 29, 2007, with a scheduled expiration date of June 29, 2010. The new station was assigned call sign WICE on September 3, 2007, then switched to WWHF on November 21, 2007. After construction and testing were completed in June 2010, the station was assigned call sign WXJB by the FCC on June 29, 2010. The station was granted its broadcast license on July 21, 2010. In 2015, the station received approval from the FCC to increase its effective radiated power to 25,000 watts.

References

External links
WXJB 99.9 FM official website

XJB
News and talk radio stations in the United States
Radio stations established in 2010
2010 establishments in Florida